The Way to Get Married is a 1796 comedy play by the British writer Thomas Morton. The play was frequently revived well into the nineteenth century.

The original cast included William Thomas Lewis as Tangent, John Quick as Toby Allspice, John Henry Johnstone as McQuery, Alexander Pope as Captain Faulkener, Joseph Shepherd Munden as Caustic, John Fawcett as Dick Dashall, Charles Farley as Servant, Charles Holland as Solicitor, Isabella Mattocks as Clementina Allspice, and Mary Ann Davenport as Lady Sorel.

References

Bibliography
 Nicoll, Allardyce. A History of English Drama 1660–1900: Volume III. Cambridge University Press, 2009.
 Hogan, C.B (ed.) The London Stage, 1660–1800: Volume V. Southern Illinois University Press, 1968.

1796 plays
Comedy plays
West End plays
Plays by Thomas Morton